David or Dave Holt may refer to:

Sports
Dave Holt (athlete) (born 1944), English runner who competed in the 1972 Olympics
David Holt (bowls) (born 1966), England international lawn and indoor bowler
David Holt (cricketer) (born 1981), Anglo-French cricketer
David Holt (footballer, born 1936), Scottish international footballer
David Holt (footballer, born 1952) (1952–2003), English professional footballer

Other people
David Holt (American actor) (1927–2003), American actor
David Eldred Holt (1843–1925), American clergyman
David Holt (musician) (born 1946), American musician
David Lee Holt (born 1960), American musician
David Holt (voice actor) (born 1966), British voice actor
David Holt (politician) (born 1979), former Oklahoma State Senator, Mayor of Oklahoma City
David Holt (psychotherapist) (1926–2002), English psychotherapist